The International Journal of Robotics Research is a peer-reviewed scientific journal that covers the field of robotics on topics from sensors and sensory interpretations to kinematics in motion planning. Its editor-in-chief is John M. Hollerbach (University of Utah). The journal was established in 1982 and is published by SAGE Publications.

Abstracting and indexing 
The journal is abstracted and indexed in Scopus and the Science Citation Index. According to the Journal Citation Reports, its 2013 impact factor is 2.503, ranking it 3rd out of 21 journals in the category "Robotics".

References

External links 
 

SAGE Publishing academic journals
English-language journals
Publications established in 1982
Robotics journals
Journals published between 13 and 25 times per year